San Giorgio di Nogaro is a railway station serving the town of San Giorgio di Nogaro, in the region of Friuli-Venezia Giulia, northern Italy. The station is located on the Venice–Trieste railway. The train services are operated by Trenitalia.

History
The station opened on 26 August 1888 on the Palmanova-San Giorgio di Nogaro railway. On 31 December 1888 the line was extended to Portogruaro. On 18 October 1897 the line was extended eastwards, to Cervignano, which was the final section of the Venice-Trieste railway which was missing. The line to Palmanova was closed in 1997, where a bus now operates in its place.

Train services
The station is served by the following service(s):

Express services (Regionale Veloce) Venice - Portogruaro - Cervignano del Friuli - Trieste

See also

History of rail transport in Italy
List of railway stations in Friuli-Venezia Giulia
Rail transport in Italy
Railway stations in Italy

References

 This article is based upon a translation of the Italian language version as of January 2016.

External links

Railway stations in Friuli-Venezia Giulia